The 14th Artistic Gymnastics World Championships were held on July 6–10, 1958 in Moscow, the capital of the USSR.

Medallists

Men's results

All-around

Floor exercise

Pommel horse

Rings

Vault

Parallel bars

Horizontal bar

Team final

Women's results

All-around

Vault

Uneven bars

Balance beam

Floor exercise

Team final

Medals

References
Gymn Forum: World Championships Results
Gymnastics

World Artistic Gymnastics Championships
Artistic gymnastics
World Artistic Gymnastics Championships
World Artistic Gymnastics Championships